This is the results breakdown of the local elections held in Aragon on 22 May 2011. The following tables show detailed results in the autonomous community's most populous municipalities, sorted alphabetically.

Overall

City control
The following table lists party control in the most populous municipalities, including provincial capitals (shown in bold). Gains for a party are displayed with the cell's background shaded in that party's colour.

Municipalities

Calatayud
Population: 21,717

Huesca
Population: 52,347

Teruel
Population: 35,241

Zaragoza
Population: 675,121

See also
2011 Aragonese regional election

References

Aragon
2011
2010s in Aragon